Adenopleurellidae is a family of crustaceans belonging to the order Harpacticoida.

Genera:
 Adenopleurella Huys, 1990
 Proceropes Huys, 1990
 Sarsocletodes Wilson, 1924

References

Harpacticoida